Hirtomurex marshalli is a species of sea snail, a marine gastropod mollusk in the family Muricidae, the murex snails or rock snails.

Description
The length of the shell attains 22 mm.

Distribution
This marine species occurs off New Caledonia at depths between 350 m and 575 m.

References

 Oliverio, M. (2008). Coralliophilinae (Neogastropoda: Muricidae) from the southwest Pacific. in: Héros, V. et al. (Ed.) Tropical Deep-Sea Benthos 25. Mémoires du Muséum national d'Histoire naturelle (1993). 196: 481-585

Hirtomurex
Gastropods described in 2008